Marine Heavy Helicopter Squadron 465 (HMH-465) is a United States Marine Corps helicopter squadron consisting of CH-53E Super Stallion transport helicopters. The squadron, known as "Warhorse", is based at Marine Corps Air Station Miramar, California and falls under the command of Marine Aircraft Group 16 (MAG-16) and the 3rd Marine Aircraft Wing (3rd MAW).

History

Early years
Marine Heavy Helicopter Squadron 465, the "Warhorse", was established on December 1, 1981 as the first West Coast squadron to fly the CH-53E Super Stallion. It became the Marine Corps' second and Marine Aircraft Group 16's first CH-53E Squadron.

The "Warhorses" deployed and flew in combat for the first time during Operation Desert Shield and Operation Desert Storm. On September 1, 1990 the squadron arrived at Jubail, Saudi Arabia in support of all joint forces in theater. During this deployment, the squadron lost two aircraft leaving the unit with six helicopters for the remainder of the war. The squadron provided heavy lift support for I MEF throughout the entire conflict. HMH-465 finally returned to Marine Corps Air Station Tustin on March 15, 1991.

1990s

Another challenge for HMH-465 came on October 5, 1991 when LtCol Russell L. Llewellyn III, Commanding Officer, deployed twelve CH-53E's and all squadron assets and personnel on five C-5's and two C-141's to Marine Corps Air Station Futenma, Okinawa, Japan for a seven-month Unit Deployment as the first CH-53E Squadron to Okinawa Japan. The squadron supported numerous exercises in this period throughout the Asian theater.

On January 13, 1995 two squadron aircraft assisted in the recovery of four Navy aircrew members who ejected when their F-14D's collided. For this action 11 squadron members were awarded Sikorsky Aircraft Rescue Awards.

In January 1998 HMH-465 achieved 20,000 mishap free flight hours.

From December 1999 to July 2000 the "Warhorse" squadron spent seven months deployed to Okinawa, Japan as part of the Unit Deployment Program. They redeployed to Okinawa in March 2001.

Global War on Terror
The Warhorses have deployed numerous times in support of Operation Iraqi Freedom. On the night of April 1, 2003, the squadron comprised the CH-53E element of Task Force 20, the special team that extracted prisoner of war Army PFC Jessica Lynch. Their latest tour began in October 2006, where they are based out of Al Asad and providing assault support to Marines in the Al Anbar Province of Iraq. On December 11, 2006, a helicopter from HMH-465 carrying 21 personnel crashed while landing, killing 1 and injuring 17.

In the spring of 2007, HMH-465 has supplied detachments for the 15th and 31st Marine Expeditionary Units. Through these detachments the Squadron has continued to support the Global War on Terror throughout Southeast Asia and provide vital disaster relief.

The Warhorses deployed three aircraft and 40 Marines to Naval Air Station Lemoore on July 2, 2008 after California Governor Arnold Schwarzenegger requested military assistance to fight raging wildfires. The helicopters provided heavy lift rotary wing support to United States Northern Command and the National Fire Center. After nearly two weeks, where they dropped more than 68,000 gallons of water on the Basin Complex Fire in Big Sur, the squadron's detachment of three helicopters and 30+ Marines was moved to McClellan Airfield near Sacramento to aid fire fighters with a  wildfire burning in Mendocino County.

Supporting the Global War on Terror continues to be a priority by conducting training detachments across eight states in preparation for further deployments.

See also
 United States Marine Corps Aviation
 Organization of the United States Marine Corps
 List of United States Marine Corps aircraft squadrons

References

Citations

Bibliography

External links

 

H465